Jeppe Nørregaard Grønning (born 24 May 1991) is a Danish professional footballer who plays for Viborg as a midfielder.

Career

FC Fyn 
Grønning started his senior career at FC Fyn; the superstructure of his childhood club B 1913. He established a strong partnership with Emil La Cour in the central midfield, and he was, among other things, involved in FC Fyn's promotion to the 1st Division (second-tier) in the 2011–12 season, where the club beat HIK in the decisive playoff match for promotion.

Viborg 
In June 2012, Grønning signed a two-year contract with 1st Division club Viborg FF. After his first six months at the club, he was named the 2013 Autumn Profile in January 2013 by the Viborg fan group Grøn Fight. Grønning became a regular part of the first-team squad that reached promotion to the Danish Superliga in the summer of 2013, but due to injuries he only made five appearances in the highest tier before being loaned out to Hobro IK in the second-tier. In Hobro, he helped secure the club its first promotion to the Superliga ever, when after the 2013–14  season ended in second place and moved up alongside Silkeborg IF. In June 2014, Grønning returned to Viborg FF.

In December 2015, he was once again voted as "Autumn Profile" of the club in a poll on Viborg Stifts Folkeblad.

On 14 December 2016, Grønning signed a contract extension with Viborg FF, keeping him there until the summer of 2019. In January 2019, Grønning signed another contract extension, this time until the summer of 2022.

On 5 September 2017, he was appointed as the club's new team captain.

Honours
Viborg
Danish 1st Division: 2012–13, 2014–15, 2020–21

References

External links 

Profile at the Viborg FF website

1991 births
Living people
Danish men's footballers
Boldklubben 1913 players
FC Fyn players
Viborg FF players
Hobro IK players
Danish 1st Division players
Danish Superliga players
Association football midfielders